Evan Landi (born April 15, 1990) is an American football tight end who is currently a free agent. Landi played college football at South Florida.

College career
Landi played college football at South Florida.

Professional career

Tampa Bay Buccaneers
On April 29, 2013, Landi was signed as an undrafted free agent by the Tampa Bay Buccaneers. On June 4, 2013, Landi was waived by the team.

New England Patriots
On August 13, 2013, Landi was signed by the New England Patriots. On August 27, 2013, Landi was released by the Patriots.

New Yorker Lions
Landi is currently playing for the New Yorker Lions, an American football team based in Germany. He won the Euro Bowl 2015.

References

External links
Tampa Bay Buccaneers bio
South Florida Bulls bio

American football tight ends
South Florida Bulls football players
New England Patriots players
Tampa Bay Buccaneers players
1990 births
Living people